Tamariki is the oldest ‘free school’ in New Zealand and one of the oldest in the world. It was founded in 1966 by a group of parents and teachers interested in preventive mental health. It is located in the Christchurch suburb of Woolston.

Its name is the Māori word for young children.

Special character
Mistakes are regarded as important learning information and grading is never done. No adult has the right to demand to see the child’s work and such access is always under the child's control. The children also have a very large measure of control over the environment; the adults in the school defer their need for a tidy environment to the child’s need to experience cause and effect; to experience why order is desirable.

The school is loosely modelled on Summerhill School.

Originally a private school, owned and operated by the parents, Tamariki integrated into the state system as a special character school in 1990.

History 
The Tamariki School was formed in 1966 by a group of parents and teachers who owned and operated the school, the school was formally opened in 1967. This group became the Proprietor of Tamariki School, and entered into an integration agreement with the Ministry of Education in 1990, to operate a state integrated primary school with a Special Character under the Private Schools Conditional Integration Act 1975. In 2017 Tamariki Celebrated its 50th Jubilee.

Notes

External links
 
 Proprietor Website

Democratic education
Alternative education
Educational institutions established in 1966
Primary schools in Christchurch
1966 establishments in New Zealand